Cynoglossus broadhursti, commonly known as the Southern tonguesole is a species of tonguefish. It is commonly found in the Indian Ocean off western and southern Australia.

References
Fishbase

Cynoglossidae
Fish described in 1905